"Odio por Amor" (Eng.: Hate for Love) is a song written and performed by Colombian singer-songwriter Juanes. This song was included on his first live album La vida... es un ratico (en vivo).

Song history
The song received a worldwide distribution on September 8, 2008, and was recorded on August 8, 2008, with the band that joins Juanes on tour. It is the first single from the re-released version of his latest album, La Vida... Es un Ratico. The singer said about the song: "It is a powerful anthem for love and change, a universal need to change hate for love." This track was written while Juanes was on the Spanish leg of his tour and he refused to wait two years to release it on his next album. The music video for this single was directed by Agustín Alberdi and shot on a military base near Buenos Aires, Argentina on a twelve-hour session on location in Morón. On this video, Juanes is shown driving a toy car, travelling through the world collecting flags from different countries.

Chart performance

References

Universal Music Colombia (2008-09-08). ""Juanes presentó la canción 'Odio por amor', un sencillo extra de su álbum 'La vida es un ratico'(In Spanish)"". Estereofonica.com.

2008 singles
Juanes songs
Rock ballads
Pop ballads
Songs written by Juanes
Spanish-language songs
Universal Music Latino singles
2007 songs